Leggio is an Italian surname and may refer to:

Luciano Leggio (1925–1993), Italian mobster
David Leggio (born 1984), American ice hockey player
Jerry Leggio (born 1935), American actor
Carmen Leggio (c. 1927–2009), American jazz tenor saxophonist

Italian-language surnames